American singer David Archuleta has released eight studio albums, six extended plays, 24 singles and 21 music videos.

In 2008, Archuleta released his self-titled album under Jive Records and debuted at number two on the Billboard 200 chart and certified Gold  by the Recording Industry Association of America (RIAA) with 760,000 copies sold in United States as of January 2011. His album single Crush was released on August 1, 2008, and debuted at number two on the Billboard Hot 100. In 2009, Archuleta released his second studio album and first Christmas album Christmas from the Heart under Jive Records, with sales of 246,000 in the United States. The album reached number thirty on the US Billboard 200 and number two on the US Holiday Albums chart.

In 2010 Archuleta released his third studio album The Other Side of Down under Jive Records and was promoted on The Other Side of Down Asian Tour that started in July 2011. The album reached number thirteen on the US Billboard 200. The unsatisfactory sales of Archuleta's second album of 60,000 copies sold, lead him to be dropped by Jive Record in 2011 after three years with the label. In 2012, Archuleta left the recording business for a two-year mission for the Church of Jesus Christ of Latter-day Saints in Chile. In 2012, Archuleta signed with Philippines network TV5 for a mini-series, Nandito Ako and released his fourth studio album Forevermore. Archuleta released his fifth studio album Begin on August 7, 2012. Following his mission Archuleta released several singles and collaborations, but only made his official comeback to music in 2017 with the EPs Orion and Leo, released on May 19 and August 25, 2017, respectively. His sixth studio album Postcards in the Sky was released on October 20, 2017, and features 16 brand new songs.

Albums

Studio albums

Compilation albums

Live albums

Extended plays

Singles

As lead artist

As featured artist

Other charted songs

Other album/DVD appearances

Albums/DVDs

Tracks

Music videos

Notes

References 

Pop music discographies
Discography
Discographies of American artists
American Idol discographies